Teleonemia is a genus of lace bugs in the family Tingidae. There are at least 80 described species in Teleonemia.

Species

References

Further reading

 
 
 

Tingidae